OBB may refer to:

 ÖBB, Austrian Federal Railways
 OBB (band), a Christian pop rock band
 Oliver B. Bumble, comic series and name of its main character
 Opaque binary blob, a file format, which is (among others) used by the Android operating system
 Open Buy Back, a security
 Oriented bounding box, a type of bounding volume used in computer geometry
 OTC Bulletin Board, a regulated quotation service for stocks that are not listed on one of the major U.S. stock exchanges
 Opening Billboard or title sequence